"Stir Me Up" is an English R&B song by Belgian-Turkish singer Hadise from her debut album Sweat.  It was her first single to receive airplay in Turkey.  The song reflects on her Turkish background and part of the song is in Turkish. It was heavily played throughout Turkey establishing Hadise as a successful artist.

Music video 
The music video for "Stir Me Up" starts off with the camera, presumably being the helicopter flying across a city.  The camera then flies into an arena where Hadise is performing the song.  Hadise is then seen on a billboard, which shows her performing in a caged cube being watched by a security camera.

Charts

Track listing 
CD listing:
"Stir me up (Radio edit)"
"Stir me up (After Party remix)"
Vinyl listing:
A1 - "Stir Me Up (After Party Remix)" - 4:05
A2 - "Stir Me Up (Radio Edit)" - 3:28
B1 - "Stir Me Up (Crunk Mix)" - 4:15
B2 - "Sweat (Nasty Remix)" - 3:31
B3 - "Stir Me Up (DJ Tools)" - 4:00

References 

2005 singles
Hadise songs
English-language Belgian songs
Songs written by Yves Jongen
2005 songs
EMI Records singles
Songs written by Hadise